Qendër Vlorë is a former municipality in the Vlorë County, southwestern Albania. At the 2015 local government reform it became a subdivision of the municipality Vlorë. The population at the 2011 census was 7,621. The municipal unit consists of the villages Bestrovë, Babicë e Madhe, Babicë e Vogël, Hoshtimë, Kaninë, Kërkovë, Nartë, Sherishtë, Panaja, Xhyherinë, Zvërnec and Sazan Island. Nartë and Zvërnec are predominantly Greek-speaking settlements.

References 

Former municipalities in Vlorë County
Administrative units of Vlorë